The Squeeze is the fourth studio album by Canadian country music group The Road Hammers. It was released on May 12, 2017 via Open Road Recordings. The album includes the singles "One Horse Town", "Crazy About You" and "Your Love is the Drug".

Track listing

Singles

References

External links

2017 albums
The Road Hammers albums
Open Road Recordings albums